The men's lightweight double sculls rowing event at the 2013 Mediterranean Games will be held from June 21–23 at the Seyhan Dam in Adana.

Schedule
All times are Eastern European Summer Time (UTC+3).

Results

Heat 1

Heat 2

Repechage

References

Rowing at the 2013 Mediterranean Games